O-1238 is a drug which is a cannabinoid derivative that is used in scientific research. It is a partial agonist at the cannabinoid receptor CB1, producing a maximal stimulation of 58.3% with a Ki of 8.45nM.

References 

Cannabinoids
Benzochromenes
Phenols
Organoazides